Andazaq is a village in Meshgin-e Gharbi Rural District, in the Central District of Meshgin Shahr County, Ardabil Province, Iran. At the 2006 census its population was 642 in 131 families.

References

External links

Tageo.com

Towns and villages in Meshgin Shahr County